The Singing Rooms is a concerto for solo violin, choir, and orchestra by the American composer Jennifer Higdon.  The work was jointly commissioned by the Philadelphia Orchestra, the Atlanta Symphony Orchestra, and the Minnesota Orchestra.  It was first performed on January 17, 2008 in Philadelphia by the violinist Jennifer Koh, The Philadelphia Singers, and the Philadelphia Orchestra under the conductor Christoph Eschenbach.  The text of the piece is set to poems by Jeanne Minahan. The piece was most recently done in March 2019 at the Kimmel Center for Performing Arts in Philadelphia by the Temple University Choirs and Orchestra, with a featured violin soloist.

Composition

Text
When first commissioned to write a violin concerto with a choral element, Higdon began searching for poetry on which to set the composition.  She wrote in the score program notes:

Structure
The Singing Rooms has a duration of roughly 37 minutes and is composed in seven movements set to the text of poems by Jeanne Minahan:
Three Windows: Two Versions of the Day
Things Aren't Always
The Interpretation of Dreams
Confession
History Lesson
A Word with God
Three Windows: Two Versions of the Day

Instrumentation
The work is scored for solo violin, SATB chorus, and an orchestra comprising two flutes, two oboes (2nd doubling English horn), two clarinets, two bassoons, four horns, three trumpets (1st doubling piccolo trumpet), three trombones, tuba, harp, timpani, two percussionists, and strings.

Reception
Howard Goldstein of BBC Music Magazine praised The Singing Rooms, writing, "Higdon [...] often lets the poems take a backseat to the concerto-like solo violin part (beautifully played by Jennifer Koh), resulting in a lavishness of musical gesture occasionally at odds with the intimate subject matter."  Bradley Bambarger of The Star-Ledger compared the work favorably to Higdon's Violin Concerto, despite noting that "it still tends to be melodically anodyne."

See also
List of compositions by Jennifer Higdon

References

Concertos by Jennifer Higdon
2007 compositions
Violin concertos
Choral compositions
Music commissioned by the Atlanta Symphony Orchestra
Music commissioned by the Philadelphia Orchestra
Music commissioned by the Minnesota Orchestra